Neophytos I, (? – after 1154) was a 12th-century clergyman who served as Ecumenical Patriarch of Constantinople in 1153. 
Neophytos was a monk at the Monastery of Theotokos the Benefactor before being elevated to the Patriarchal throne after the death in office of his predecessor. His short reign as Patriarch of Constantinople—of about a year—was uneventful, and he retired to become an ascetic. His short reign was during the rule of Byzantine emperor Manuel I Comnenus.

References 

neofytos, -on = in Greek, adj. newly planted, recent convert; Dodson Greek-English Lexicon, nr 3504. 2012.

Sources 
 

1070s births
1153 deaths
12th-century patriarchs of Constantinople
Officials of Manuel I Komnenos